The Latin Grammy Award for Best Engineered Album is given every year since the 1st Latin Grammy Awards ceremony in 2000 which took place at the Staples Center in Los Angeles, California. The first winner in the category was Juan Luis Guerra's Ni Es Lo Mismo Ni Es Igual, with Carlos Álvarez, Mike Couzzi, Bolívar Gómez, Miguel Hernández, Luis Mansilla, Carlos Ordehl, Eric Ramos, July Ruiz and Eric Schilling receiving the award.

The category at the 2020 Latin Grammy Awards is defined as being "for newly recorded albums released for the first time during the current eligibility year." Eligible for the award are "credited recording engineer(s), mixing engineer(s) and mastering engineer(s)." The performing artist of the album does not receive the award or nominations unless they are also a recording engineer, mixer or mastering engineer.

Out of all the winners in this category, six of them have also been nominated for Album of the Year (Ni Es Lo Mismo Ni Es Igual (2000), MTV Unplugged (2005), Dear Diz (Every Day I Think of You) (2012), Hasta la Raíz (2015), Mis Planes Son Amarte (2017) and El Madrileño (2021)) while five of them have won both awards (No Es Lo Mismo (2004), Fijación Oral Vol. 1 (2006), La Llave de mi Corazón (2007), El Mal Querer (2019) and Motomami (2022)).

Winners and nominees

2000s

2010s

2020s

References

External links
Official site of the Latin Grammy Awards

 
Engineered Album